Périgueux - Bassillac Airport  is an airport in the village of Bassillac in the Dordogne department, Nouvelle-Aquitaine region, France.

Facilities
It has one paved runway designated 11/29 which measures .

Airlines and destinations

As of 7 July 2018, there are no regular passenger flights.

Statistics

Tenants
 ASSAP - Périgueux Aéroclub (piloting lessons)
 GenAIRation Antonov Association (Antonov An-2 exploitation)
 CVVP - parachuting center Périgord
 Périgord Air Job

References

External links

 
 

Airports in Nouvelle-Aquitaine
Buildings and structures in Dordogne